Dan Patlansky is a South African blues guitarist, singer and songwriter. Blues & Soul magazine selected him as their Male Artist of the Year in December 2015 and Total Guitar magazine selected him as the number 4 of 10 Best Rock Guitarists in the World in December 2015.

Discography
 Standing at the Station (1999)
 True Blues (2004)
 Real 2006)
 Move My Soul (2009)
 20 Stones (2012)
 Wooden Thoughts (2013)
 Dear Silence Thieves (2014)
 Introvertigo (2016)
 Perfection Kills (2018)
 Shelter of Bones (2022)

External links
 Official Dan Patlansky website

South African guitarists
South African singer-songwriters